Netherlands competed at the 2014 European Athletics Championships in Zürich, Switzerland, from 12–17 August 2014. A delegation of 43 athletes were sent to represent the country.

Medals

Results

Men
 Track and road

Field events

Combined events – Decathlon

Women
 Track and road

Field events

Combined events – Heptathlon

Key
Note–Ranks given for track events are within the athlete's heat only
Q = Qualified for the next round
q = Qualified for the next round as a fastest loser or, in field events, by position without achieving the qualifying target
NR = National record
N/A = Round not applicable for the event
Bye = Athlete not required to compete in round

See also
Netherlands at other European Championships in 2014
 Netherlands at the 2014 European Road Championships

References

Nations at the 2014 European Athletics Championships
Netherlands at the European Athletics Championships
European Athletics Championships